Chatsworth is a civil parish in Derbyshire, England, within the area of the Derbyshire Dales and the Peak District National Park.

The population is largely in and around Chatsworth House and is considered to be too low to justify a parish council. Instead, there is a parish meeting, at which all electors may attend.

Most of Chatsworth belongs to the Duke of Devonshire's Chatsworth estate, the villages of which include Beeley, Pilsley and Edensor.

History

John Marius Wilson's Imperial Gazetteer of England and Wales  (1870-1872) says - 

John Bartholomew's Gazetteer of the British Isles says -

See also
Listed buildings in Chatsworth, Derbyshire

References

External links

The Official Chatsworth website
Parish of Chatsworth at British-towns.net
Chatsworth page at derbyshire-peakdistrict.co.uk

Towns and villages of the Peak District
Civil parishes in Derbyshire